G theory may refer to:
 g factor in psychology
 Generalizability theory in the measurement theory